Ferula moschata (syn. Ferula sumbul), the musk root or sumbul, is a species of flowering plant in the family Apiaceae, found from Central Asia to western Xinjiang. Its roots are the source of muskroot, a substitute for animal musk in medicinal and perfumery applications.

References

moschata
Flora of Uzbekistan
Flora of Tajikistan
Flora of Kyrgyzstan
Flora of Xinjiang
Plants described in 1926